Club León, also known as León, is a Mexican professional football club based in León, Guanajuato, that competes in the Liga MX, the top flight of Mexican football.

León has won the Primera División de México/Liga MX title eight times in 1948, 1949, 1952, 1956, 1992, the Apertura in 2013, the Clausura in 2014, and the Apertura in 2020. After winning the League and the México Cup in 1949, it became the first Mexican campeonísimo. León was the CONCACAF Champions' Cup runner-up in 1993. It is the second-only Mexican club to win back-to-back championships.

The club qualified for the Champion's Cup in 1998 until it was eliminated in the semi-final. The team has been a consistent contender for the Primera División since 2002. It failed to reach the Primera División due to a series of mediocre performances in the playoffs despite good plays during the regular season until the 2012 Clausura tournament. Ten years later, León reached the Primera División after defeating Correcaminos UAT. In the Apertura 2013, it won the championship by defeating América with a score of 5–1 which earned it its sixth championship star. In Clausura 2014, it became champion for the second year in a row by defeating Pachuca with 4–3, giving it its seventh championship star and the title of "bicampeones". In recent years, Club Leon has attracted a non-Spanish speaking football fanbase and managed to secure new Spanish-language broadcast partnerships with Fox Sports Latinoamérica in Mexico and Telemundo Deportes in the U.S. Since 2016, TUDN holds the U.S. broadcasting rights to León home games.

León is ranked No. 29 in the IFFHS Central and North America's best clubs of the 20th century.

History 
The club was created from an application by Unión de Curtidores which merged with Selección de Guanajuato. With the money raised, the directive hired Marcial Ortiz, Raul Varela, Alfonso Montemayor, Salvador Ramírez, Conrado Muniz, Vicente Serrano, Pepe Cortes, "Sticks" Ramírez, Elpidio Sánchez, and Joaquín Source Duillo Dobles. It participated in the Liga Mayor's second season (1944–45). The team comprised Argentinian players and Miguel Rugilo that served as coach and goalkeeper holder. Battaglia played defense plus two fronts; Marcos Aurelio scored 14 goals with Ángel Fernández. The team debuted at Patria Stadium on August 20, 1944, against Atlante and lost by a score of 5–3.

In the 1945–46 season another team appeared in the city: the San Sebastián de León. They placed fourth out of 16 teams with 30 games, 17 wins, 4 draws, 9 losses for 38 points. Their top scorer, with 24 goals, Alberto Mendoza.

In the 1946–47 season notable players joined, one of whom was Adalberto Lopez, who scored 33 goals. In general, the team had a great campaign being runner-up with 41 points and maintained a fourteen-game winning streak. Another important element was Marcos Aurelio, who highlighted with 16 goals. A match against Atlante was scheduled place in Mexico City on June 1, 1947, in the Stadium Insurgentes (now Estadio Ciudad de los Deportes) which took place in León, but had to switch venues due to an epidemic of foot-and-mouth disease afflicting the Bajío region

In a match against Club America on May 9, 1946, Florencio Caffaratti accidentally touched an electrical wire after scoring a goal. Alfonso Montemayor rescued him. Subsequently, Caffaratti gave a gold coin to Montemayor with the inscription: "In appreciation of Montemayor by F. Caffaratti."

1947–48

When José María Casullo coached Club León, the greens lost seven times, three of them against Atlas Gold. The team tied at 36 points with the Jalisco Gold at first place. Jalisco Gold broke the tie with a score of 2–0.

1948–49

Club León defeated Asturias 2–0 with goals by Adalberto López to prevent a tie with Atlas and Guadalajara who remained a point, and Leon became the first to win the tournament campeonísimo cup after defeating Atlante 3–0 on August 14, 1949.

1951–52
Club León switched coaches to Antonio López Herranz. Antonio Carbajal joined the team with the return of Marcos Aurelio, Sergio Bravo, and Saturnino Martínez. The team played against a Guadalajara team coached by José María Casullo. León won both games of the year with scores of 1–0. In the penultimate round, León lost to Guadalajara by 1 point.

In the following season, the team remained in third place at 27 points. For the 1953–54 season it finished eighth with 21 points.

1955–56
The season's roster increased to 14 teams. León won the best streak in club history with 12 wins and 7 draws before losing against Tampico (1–0). The final game was played at the University Olympic Stadium Mexico City, where León defeated Oro (4–2) and Toluca.

In 1956–57 León lost to Guadalajara. In 1957–58 they reached fifth place but won the Cup title.

1960s
León remained in fifth place in the 1960–61 season with 26 points, fifth place in 1961–62 with 25 points, ninth place in 1962–63 with 25 points, ninth place in 1963–64 with 25 points, seventh place in 1964–65 with 30 points, ninth place in 1965–66 with 28 points, fifth place in 1966–67 with 34 points, fifth place in 1967–68 with 35 points, seventh place in 1968–69 with 31 points, and seventh place in 1969–70 with 31 points and when Hugo Sanchez join club leon they won the apertura 1975 si club leon was the best team back in the days on the 70s and late 80s.

1970s
For the Mexico 70 Tourney, there were two technical changes: the starter Argentine Luis Grill was replaced, but was reinstated after Antonio Carbajal left, as a result, left with 33 points to fourth overall Sergio Anaya new stand becomes scorer the contest with 16 touchdowns, while Luis Estrada mark 13 goals. 1970–71 players arrive, Jorge Davino, Roberto Salomone and Juan Valiente who scored ten goals, the club was led by Carbajal and ranked fourth with 38 points.

In 1972–73, initiate driven A. Carbajal was replaced by Rafael Albrecht that served as player and coach. The final game was against Cruz Azul.

In 1973–74 the team failed to qualify at fifth place with 40 points.

First relegation
In 1986–87 Jorge Davino scored 10 points in 19 days and start the 31 day leon when back to second division and they appear back on first division on May 10, 2012 and they won the apertuna when they arrived to first division.

1990s
The Esmeraldas returned to the Primera División for the 1990–91 season and were coached by Victor Manuel Vucetich, who debuted in the top flight and led the entire tournament. He led the club in sixth place with 41 points but did not qualify to be third in group 3, and Martin Uribe Francisco Peña highlighted with 13 and 12 goals.

Second relegation
Robert Zermeno cost the team and landed them in last place with 19 points.

After relegation, the club was sold to Argentine businessman Carlos Ahumada.

On 19 November 2010, Grupo Pachuca purchased the club.

Return to Primera División
Argentine Gustavo Matosas began leading León on 7 January 2012, after being hired in September 2011. During the Apertura 2011 campaign, he could not have a presence off the bench or be registered as coach because he had coached Querétaro FC in the same tournament. Matosas' 10 wins, 4 draws, and 0 defeats in 14 regular season fixtures, resulted in an ERA of 70.83% and the overall leader, helping them earn a direct qualification to semi-finals of the play-offs. In the semi-finals, they faced Correcaminos UAT and won 1–0 in the second match before facing the Lobos BUAP in the final, winning by an aggregate score of 7–3 and the right to play again in the Promotional Final. Facing 2011 Apertura championship winners Correcaminos UAT, León won by an aggregate score of 6–2, thus returning to the Mexican top-flight for the 2012–13 season. León had struggled for their fourth final for promotion after losing against Irapuato in 2003, Dorados de Sinaloa in 2005, and Indios de Ciudad Juárez in 2008.

León won both tournaments (the Apertura and Clausura) of the 2013–14 season and became the first team in Mexico's history to win two consecutive championship titles twice — winning the first of these during the 1947–48 and 1948–49 leagues consecutively.

Matosas and León parted ways after failing to make it to the 2014 Apertura championship stage. Argentine Juan Antonio Pizzi was named as his replacement.

On 31 January 2016, following a 3–1 away loss to Tigres UANL, Pizzi left the charge to join Chile as their new manager and was subsequently was replaced by Luis Fernando Tena. The club managed to reach the semi-final stage of the Clausura championship, losing out to sibling club and eventual winners C.F. Pachuca with an aggregate score of 3–2.

Following a lackluster beginning to the 2016 Apertura where León summed up 4 points within 7 league matches, Tena was let go and Argentina Javier Torrente was brought in. Regardless of the uninspiring start, the club managed to reach the championship stage, losing to eventual winners Tigres UANL in the semi-finals by an aggregate score of 3–1.

In August 2017, Torrente was let go after a year as manager and was replaced by Gustavo Díaz.

On 18 September 2018, Ignacio Ambríz was named manager of León, replacing Díaz. During the 2019 Clausura, he helped León attain the records of most consecutive wins with eleven and the most points attained during the 17-match tournament format (41 points). They faced Tigres UANL in the Clausura championship final but lost following an aggregate score of 1–0. Regardless, Ambríz's feats with the club contributed to him being named best manager at the conclusion of the season.

After a first place finish with 40 points in the Guardianes 2020 general table, on 13 December, León won the league title defeating Club Universidad Nacional with an aggregate score of 3–1, becoming Mexico's joint fourth most successful team with eight titles in total alongside Cruz Azul.

León Stadium

Estadio León (unofficially known as "Nou Camp") is a football stadium in León, Guanajuato, Mexico. The stadium hosts Club León and some lower division teams and subsidiaries. It is also used for special events such as presentations and musicals.

Construction of the stadium started on August 18, 1965, and at the end of 1966, the finished building that would house Los Esmeraldas was completed.

On 1 February 1967, the stadium was inaugurated with a match between Santos of Brazil and River Plate of Argentina, ending in a 2–1 victory for Santos.

Estadio León has hosted 2 World Cups: the first was 1970 FIFA World Cup, with guests like West Germany, Peru, Bulgaria and Morocco, as well as hosting the quarterfinal game between West Germany and England; and the 1986 FIFA World Cup. the stadium hosted group matches featuring the Soviet Union, France, Hungary and Canada, as well as a second-round match between the USSR and Belgium.

On 8 March 2017, judiciary officials of the city of León determined that ownership of Estadio Leon is the property of previous Club Leon owners Zermeño Reyes and Héctor González.

On 9 October 2020, the club departed from the stadium following a ruling that transferred ownership to a private interest. As a result, the club declared it would play its remainder of tournament matches at Estadio Victoria, home stadium of Club Necaxa. The club returned following one match at their temporary stadium.

The stadium is planned to become a historical stadium with parts of the stadium being converted into a museum. Talks are in place to start building a new stadium in León for the future team though there is no set date.

Rivalries
The oldest rival of Club León is Unión de Curtidores, a rivalry which began as both teams reside in León, Guanajuato. Unión de Curtidores was founded in 1928, and during its early years, was the dominant team in León. When they joined the Liga Mayor (now Liga MX) in 1943, part of the team merged with Selección de Guanajuato and took the name of Unión-León, which later became Club León.

Despite the rivalry against Los Curtidores being the oldest in León, the prominent one today is against Irapuato, who also appeared in the Clásico del Bajio, which has been fought in both the Primera División and the Primera División A (now Ascenso MX).

Another rivalry is with Pachuca C.F., mainly because of similar owners for the two clubs. On July 11, 2018, Club León and Pachuca met in a friendly match played in Milwaukee, Wisconsin, at Miller Park, home of the Milwaukee Brewers. Pachuca won the match 3–1 in front of 18,321 fans.

Honours

Domestic

Primera División / Liga MX
Champions (8): 1947–48, 1948–49, 1951–52, 1955–56, 1991–92, Apertura 2013, Clausura 2014, Guardianes 2020
Runners-up (7): 1946–47, 1958–59, 1972–73, 1974–75, Invierno 1997, Clausura 2019, Apertura 2021

Ascenso MX
Champions (5): 1989–90, Verano 2003, Clausura 2004, Clausura 2008, Clausura 2012
Runners-up (3): Clausura 2005, Clausura 2007, Bicentenario 2010

Copa México / Copa MX
Champions (5): 1948–49, 1957–58, 1966–67, 1970–71, 1971–72
Runners-up (5): 1952–53, 1956–57, 1958–59, 1965–66, Apertura 2015

Campeón de Campeones
Champions (5): 1948, 1949, 1956, 1971, 1972
Runners-up (5): 1952, 1958, 1967, 1992, 2021

International
Leagues Cup
Champions (1): 2021

Friendly tournaments
Copa León
Champions (2): 2004, 2012
Torneo Cuna del Fútbol Mexicano
Champions (1): 2012
Copa Telcel
Champions (1): 2013
Trofeo Joan Gamper
Runners-up (1): 2014

Current staff

Management

Players

First-team squad

Out on loan

Reserve teams

León GEN
Reserve team that plays in the Liga TDP, the fourth level of the Mexican league system.

Former players

  Mauro Boselli
  Isaac Ayipei

Top Goal Scorers

Managers

 Antonio López Herranz (1951–52), (1955–56), (1957–58)
 Luis Grill Prieto (1966–67), (1970)
 Antonio Carbajal (1969–70), (1970–72)
 Árpád Fekete (1981)
 Juan Ricardo Faccio (1982)
 Árpád Fekete (1983–85)
 Pedro García Barros (1987–88)
 Víctor Manuel Vucetich (1989–1993)
 Sebastiao Lazaroni (1993–94)
 Roberto Saporiti (1994)
 José Luis Saldívar (1996)
 Carlos Reinoso (1997)
 Aníbal Ruiz (1997–98)
 Alberto Guerra (1998)
 Carlos Reinoso (1999–00)
 José Luis Saldívar (2000)
 Enrique López Zarza (March 27, 2001 – April 16, 2001)
 Pablo Centrone (2001–03)
 Efraín Flores (2002)
 Carlos Reinoso (2003)
 José Luis Saldívar (2005)
 Sergio Bueno (January 1, 2007 – June 30, 2008)
 Mario García (July 1, 2008 – October 13, 2008)
 Luis Scatolaro (May 28, 2009 – June 4, 2009)
 Salvador Reyes (July 1, 2009 – October 24, 2009)
 José Luis Salgado (January 1, 2010 – July 24, 2010)
 Sergio Orduña (August 7, 2010 – August 22, 2010)
 Pintado (September 10, 2010 – December 31, 2010)
 Tita (January 1, 2011 – September 14, 2011)
 Pedro Muñoz (September 15, 2011 – December 31, 2011)
 Gustavo Matosas (January 1, 2012 – November 24, 2014)
 Juan Antonio Pizzi (November 24, 2014 – January 28, 2016)
 Luis Fernando Tena (February 2016 – August 2016)
 Javier Torrente (August 2016 – August 2017)
 Gustavo Díaz (September 2017 – September 2018)
 Ignacio Ambríz (September 2018 – May 2021)
 Ariel Holan (May 2021 – April 2022)
 Renato Paiva (May 2022 – November 2022)
 Nicolás Larcamón (November 2022 – Present)

References

Full list published by IFFHS on 8 October 2009

External links

 

 
Football clubs in Guanajuato
Club Leon
Association football clubs established in 1944
1944 establishments in Mexico
Ascenso MX teams
Liga MX teams